1951 was the 52nd season of County Championship cricket in England. It produced a surprise title for Warwickshire, their first for forty years and only the second in their history.

It was the first achieved under a professional captain, Tom Dollery, one of the Wisden Cricketers of the Year in 1952. It was a comfortable victory as Warwickshire won 16 matches while second-placed Yorkshire won 12 and lost twice convincingly to Warwickshire.

South Africa toured England to compete in a test series in which England won 3–1.

Honours
County Championship - Warwickshire
Minor Counties Championship - Kent II
Wisden - Bob Appleyard, Tom Dollery, Jim Laker, Peter May, Eric Rowan

Test series

England defeated South Africa 3–1 with one match drawn.

County Championship

Leading batsmen

Leading bowlers

References

Annual reviews
 Playfair Cricket Annual 1952
 Wisden Cricketers' Almanack 1952

External links
 CricketArchive – season summary
 English Domestic Season, 1951 at Cricinfo

1951 in English cricket
English cricket seasons in the 20th century